Hugh Poland (1868 – 3 January 1938) was a member of parliament for the  electorate in New Zealand.

Early life
Poland was born in Tuakau, the son of John and Teresa Poland. All sources give his year of birth as 1868, but the birth certificated held by the Department of Internal Affairs is dated 29 June 1867. He received his education at Tuakau School and at Auckland Grammar School. In his youth, he was a prominent athlete, and he represented Auckland in rugby from 1887 to 1891, and in 1894. After school, he was initially a teacher for two years, worked as a flaxmiller in Helensville, and then had stores in Rotorua and Paeroa; he remained in the latter place for the rest of his life.

Political career

Local body career
Poland first stood for election to the Ohinemuri County Council in November 1899. He was the highest-polling candidate in his riding and was thus declared elected. He served on the county council until 1908, and was chairman from 1901 to 1905, and was on the Licensing Committee and Education Committee.

Member of Parliament
Hugh Poland represented the  electorate in the New Zealand House of Representatives for twenty years from 1905 to 1925. Poland was a Liberal until the 1919 election when he stood as an Independent and was successful.  Whilst not a member of the Labour Party, he was regarded by his voters as a "miners' advocate" and his lobbying contributed to the establishment of the phthisis pension.

In 1935, he was awarded the King George V Silver Jubilee Medal.

Community involvement
Poland was secretary of the Ohinemuri Jockey Club for over three decades. He gifted the Poland Memorial Cup for Thames Valley rugby union, and was an officer for the local rugby union for many years.

Family and death
On 10 August 1892, Poland married Mary Ellen Hand, the daughter of James Hand of Helensville. One of their sons, Hugh Francis "Frank" Poland, was killed in the Battle of Passchendaele during World War I. Hugh Poland died on 3 January 1938 at Paeroa, survived by his wife, seven sons, and four daughters. His funeral service was held by James Liston, the Roman Catholic bishop of Auckland. He is buried at Pukerimu Lawn Cemetery, also known as Paeroa Cemetery.

Poland built his house in Paeroa in 1899. The street was later named Poland Street in his honour. The house still stands and operates as a bed and breakfast.

Notes

References

External links

Poland's house now run as a bed and breakfast

|-

1868 births
1938 deaths
Independent MPs of New Zealand
New Zealand Liberal Party MPs
Local politicians in New Zealand
New Zealand businesspeople in retailing
New Zealand educators
Unsuccessful candidates in the 1925 New Zealand general election
Members of the New Zealand House of Representatives
New Zealand MPs for North Island electorates
New Zealand rugby union players
People educated at Auckland Grammar School
Auckland rugby union players
People from Tuakau
People from Paeroa